The Permanent task force of the Russian Navy in the Mediterranean Sea is a task force of the Russian Navy responsible for projecting Russian power in the Middle East through the Mediterranean Sea.

The Soviet Navy's 5th Operational Squadron had fulfilled a similar role between its formation in 1967, and its deactivation on 31 December 1992.  The permanent task force was established in 2013.

Permanent task force of the Russian Navy in the Mediterranean Sea
In September 2013, the Russian Ministry of Defence re-established a fleet in the Mediterranean using a combination of ships from the Black Sea Fleet and Northern Fleet stationed in Syria. It has been reported to comprise 15 warships and auxiliary vessels with vessels from the Baltic Fleet also providing contingents for operations in the region.

Russian military intervention in the Syrian Civil War
With the start of the military operation of the Russian Aerospace Forces in Syria on 30 September 2015, the formation took part in this operation, covering the airborne forces of the Russian Aerospace Forces in Syria and the Khmeimim Air Base at which it is deployed. The main objective of the formation was to ensure the activities of the Russian troops in Syria. Presently, it continues to facilitate and replenish Russian forces stationed there and also help out with any search and rescue operations in its area of responsibility.

Component Vessels
As of 2020, Russian naval units in the Mediterranean regularly included:

 2 Improved Kilo-class submarines (drawn from the Black Sea Fleet ostensibly en route for maintenance in the Baltic to comply with provisions of the Montreux Convention; but remaining for prolonged periods in the Mediterranean);
 Up to 2 nuclear-powered submarines (drawn from the Northern Fleet when deployed);
 Major surface combatants (drawn from the Black Sea Fleet and on rotation from the Northern or Baltic Fleets);
 Light Corvettes/Offshore Patrol/mine countermeasures Vessels (principally drawn from the Black Sea Fleet);
 Ropucha-class and Alligator-class landing ships (principally from the Black Sea Fleet but on occasion may also be drawn from other fleets) providing logistic support and re-supply for the Russian naval facility in Tartus;
 Support vessels and specialist auxiliary vessels; and, 
 Light patrol/anti-saboteur vessels (for security at the Tartus naval facility).

Naval units can be supported by aircraft operating from the Khmeimim Air Base in Syria. Units deployed have included Tu-22M3 Backfire bombers as well as Su-24s, Su-35s, MiG-31s and Tu-142MK and Il-38 anti-submarine warfare aircraft.

Activity

Background

Between December 2007–February 2008, the Russian Navy made the first large deployment to the Mediterranean Sea in 15 years. Vice-Admiral Nikolai Maksimov, the Northern Fleet commander, said during the operations that "After this visit to the Mediterranean and France, the first in 15 years, we will establish a constant presence in the region".

2013
In September 2013, the permanent task force was formed. It was temporarily strengthened by Moskva (11 September–18 November), Northern Fleet's heavy cruiser  (2 November–8 May 2014) and Pacific Fleet's cruiser Varyag (2 November–unknown) and destroyer  (2 November–November).

2014
In 2014, the task force was temporarily strengthened by Black Sea Fleet's cruiser Moskva (6 September–18 January 2015), Northern Fleet's aircraft carrier Admiral Kuznetsov (10 January–8 May), heavy cruiser Pyotr Velikiy (2 November 2013–8 May 2014), destroyers Admiral Levchenko (10 January–30 June), Vice-Admiral Kulakov (28 April–December) and Severomorsk (28 November–10 April 2015) and Baltic Fleet's frigate  (August–16 February 2015).

2015
In 2015, the task force was temporarily strengthened by Black Sea Fleet's cruiser Moskva (6 September 2014–18 January, 1 June–18 August and 25 September–9 January 2016) and Northern Fleet's destroyers Severomorsk (28 November 2014–10 April 2015) and Vice-Admiral Kulakov (November–25 March 2016) and Baltic Fleet's frigate Yaroslav Mudry (August 2014–16 February 2015).

2016
In 2016, the task force was temporarily strengthened by Black Sea Fleet's cruiser Moskva (25 September 2015–9 January 2016), Pacific Fleet's cruiser Varyag (3 January 2016–spring), Baltic Fleet's frigate Yaroslav Mudry (11 June–9 October) and Northern Fleet's aircraft carrier Admiral Kuznetsov, heavy cruiser Pyotr Velikiy (both 26 October–20 January 2017) and destroyers Severomorsk (26 October–24 May 2017) and Vice-Admiral Kulakov (November 2015–25 March 2016 and 26 October–6 December).

The mainstay of the task force were Black Sea Fleet's frigates  (5 May–10 June), Pytlivy (25 May–1 July and 6 August–28 November) and Admiral Grigorovich (May–9 June and 24 September–6 October) as well as destroyer  (7 March–9 June and 25 October–5 March 2017).

Between October 2016–January 2017 Russian Navy intervened in the Syrian Civil War during the Battle of Aleppo deploying a carrier strike group of the Northern Fleet's aircraft carrier Admiral Kuznetsov, which included heavy cruiser Pyotr Velikiy, destroyers Severomorsk and Vice-Admiral Kulakov and likely a nuclear submarine. The Admiral Kuznetsov'''s airwing, composed of 6-8 Su-33s and 4 MiG-29Ks flew missions in Syria. A Su-33 and a MiG-29K were lost due to malfunctions of the arresting wires, with pilots being safely rescued.

2017

2018
In 2018, the task force was temporarily strengthened by Northern Fleet's cruiser  (11 August–12 November) and destroyer Severomorsk (11 August–3 May 2019) as well as Baltic Fleet's frigate Yaroslav Mudry (26 April–October).

Between 1–8 September, the largest Russian post-Cold war naval exercise in the Mediterranean Sea was conducted. Dubbed Ocean shield, it was the first iteration of Ocean shield exercises, which were in the next two years held in the Baltic Sea. 26 ships, 2 submarines and 34 aircraft were included. Among participants were cruiser Marshal Ustinov, destroyers Smetlivy and Severomorsk, frigates Admiral Grigorovich, Admiral Essen, Admiral Makarov, Pytlivy and Yaroslav Mudry, corvettes Vishny Volochyok, Grad Sviyazhsk and Veliky Ustyug and conventional submarines Kolpino and Velikiy Novgorod.

Aircraft present included Tu-160 bombers, Tu-142 and Il-38 anti-submarine aircraft and Su-33 and MiG-29K maritime fighters. This was the largest Russian naval exercise in the Mediterranean Sea of the post-Cold War era and the largest Russian post-Cold War naval exercise in the far sea zone. In terms of distant location and number of capital ships participating it's comparable only to June 2021 exercises of the Pacific Fleet off the Hawaii islands.

2019
In 2019, the task force was temporarily strengthened by Northern Fleet's cruiser Marshal Ustinov (22 August–30 October and 18 December–28 January 2020), destroyers Vice-Admiral Kulakov (December 2019–January 2020) and Severomorsk (11 August 2018–3 May 2019) and frigate  (10–20 March).

2020
In 2020, the task force was temporarily strengthened by Northern Fleet's cruiser Marshal Ustinov (18 December 2019–28 January 2020) and destroyer Vice-Admiral Kulakov (December 2019–January 2020 and 6 August–8 November), as well as Baltic Fleet's frigate Yaroslav Mudry (March–April).

The mainstay of the Squadron were Black Sea Fleet's frigates Admiral Grigorovich (28 February–26 June and 29 December 2020–8 May 2021), Admiral Essen (21 December 2019–11 April and 29 September–28 December) and Admiral Makarov (28 February–11 April and 24 June–19 October).

2021
In 2021, the task force was temporarily strengthened by Baltic Fleet's corvette  (29 December 2020–19 April 2021), Northern Fleet's frigate Admiral Kasatonov (14 January–1 April) and destroyer Vice-Admiral Kulakov (18 August–23 September) and Black Sea Fleet's cruiser Moskva (18 June–5 July). In the summer, corvette Gremyashchiy and submarines Petropavlovsk-Kamchatsky and Volkhov transited the Mediterranean Sea on their way from the Baltic Sea to the Pacific Ocean.

The mainstay of the Squadron were Black Sea Fleet's frigates Admiral Grigorovich (24 December 2020–8 May 2021 and 28 October–), Admiral Makarov (2 May–13 August) and Admiral Essen (18 June–5 July and 7 August–30 October).

On 25 May 2021, three Tu-22Ms maritime bombers were deployed to the Khmeymim airbase in Syria for the first time. The deployment took place after a significant boost in NATO amphibious capability in the Mediterranean earlier in 2021. French aircraft carrier Charles de Gaulle has left Toulon for a deployment in the Persian Gulf via the eastern Mediterranean in the mid February. American aircraft carrier USS Dwight D. Eisenhower conducted an exercise with the French helicopter carrier Tonerre off Greece in March and, in May, British aircraft carrier HMS Queen Elizabeth embarked on a maiden voyage to the Indian Ocean via the Mediterranean, where it will hold exercises with Charles de Gaulle.

On 25 June 2021, two anti-ship interceptors MiG-31K, armed with Kinzhal missiles were deployed to Khmeymim airbase for the first time and fired Kinzhal in an exercise the same day. They participated in a large-scale anti-ship exercise, which included cruiser Moskva, frigates Admiral Essen and Admiral Makarov and submarines Stary Oskol and Rostov-on-Don, three bombers Tu-22M3, as well as anti-submarine aircraft Il-38 and Tu-142.

The newest air defence system S-500 was reportedly tested at Khmeymim airbase and obtained a lock on a F-35 fighter from the HMS Queen Elizabeth. The exercise included rocket fire 30 km away from the HMS Queen Elizabeth. The exercise took place during the deployment of the British aircraft carrier HMS Queen Elizabeth to the Eastern Mediterranean and have coincided with aircraft carrier USS Dwight D. Eisenhower reentering the Mediterranean Sea after three months in the Indian Ocean through the Suez Canal on 1 July.

On 16 November, British aircraft carrier HMS Queen Elizabeth reentered the Mediterranean Sea through the Suez Canal. Since the only Russian large surface combatant present in the area Admiral Grigorovich was in the western Mediterranean Sea, taking part in Russo-Algerian naval exercise between 16 and 17 November, it's unclear whether Russia sent any ship at all to shadow the aircraft carrier, except for the airplanes.
On 23 November, Admiral Grigorovich was already reported off Tartus.

2022

In 2022, the Russian Navy operated in the Adriatic Sea for the first time since 1995 Volk's deployment amid US bombardment of Bosnia and Herzegovina. In late July, destroyer Admiral Tributs operated off Šibenik, intelligence ship Vasily Tatishchev operated near island Palagruža, cruiser Varyag operated near Durres, while frigate Admiral Grigorovich remained just outside the Adriatic Sea. As the US carrier Truman was located in the Adriatic Sea at the same time, there were reports in media about Russian warships simulating blocking the US carrier in the Adriatic Sea.

In August 2022, Russia deployed Severodvinsk to the Mediterranean Sea, making it the first Russian nuclear submarine in the Mediterranean since Kursk and Tomsk in 1999.

Role in the 2022 Russian invasion of Ukraine
In conjunction with a build-up of Russian forces around Ukraine and in Belarus, Russia began to reinforce the task force in the Mediterranean toward the end of 2021. The principal movements involved the deployment of two Slava-class cruisers - Marshal Ustinov from the Northern Fleet and Varyag from the Pacific Fleet - to the Mediterranean, together with additional escorts. At the same time, the submarine Rostov Na Donu returned to the Black Sea from the Mediterranean just prior to the outbreak of hostilities. 
The movements strengthened Russian anti-surface group capabilities in the Mediterranean prior to the outbreak of war. Simultaneously, Bastion-P anti-ship missile batteries were installed at the Russian base in Syria to improve its defensive capabilities.

On 28 February, four days after the outbreak of hostilities, Turkey indicated that it was closing the Dardanelles Straits to all foreign warships for the duration of the conflict. Turkish Foreign Minister, Mevlüt Çavuşoğlu, argued that the move was consistent with terms of the Montreaux Convention of 1936. An exception would be allowed for Russian ships returning from the Mediterranean to Black Sea bases where they were registered. The move limited Russia's ability to reinforce its naval units in the Mediterranean from the Black Sea though it also effectively confined NATO naval forces to the Mediterranean.

During 2022, known Russian naval forces deployed with the task force reportedly included:

 two Improved Kilo-class submarines (Novorossiysk (B-261) and Krasnodar (B-265)); Novorossiysk redeployed to the Baltic for maintenance as of September 2022
 at least one Russian nuclear-powered submarine (later reported to be the Yasen-class submarine Severodvinsk) entered the Mediterranean in August 2022
 two Slava-class cruisers (Varyag and Marshal Ustinov; Marshal Ustinov was reported to have left the Mediterranean in August 2022, likely returning to her home base on the Kola Peninsula while Varyag departed the Mediterranean in October via the Suez canal likely returning to the Pacific).
 two Udaloy-class destroyers (Admiral Tributs and Vice-Admiral Kulakov - Vice-Admiral Kulakov departed the Mediterranean, in company with Marshal Ustinov, late August 2022 while Admiral Tributs departed the Mediterranean in company with Varyag in October 2022)
 the frigate Admiral Kasatonov
 the frigate [[Russian frigate Admiral Grigorovich|Admiral Grigorovich]]
 the Steregushchiy-class corvettes Soobrazitelny and Stoikiy entered the Mediterranean in October 2022
 the Buyan-M-class corvette Orekhovo-Zuyevo
 Additional mine warfare units/auxiliaries.

Commanders
Captain of the First Rank  (2013–2014)
Captain of the First Rank Aleksandr Okun (2015–2016)
Captain of the First Rank Pavel Yasnitsky (2016–?)
Captain of the First Rank Pavel Prosekov (interim) (2020–present)

References

Military units and formations established in 2013
2013 establishments in Russia
Russia–Syria relations
Naval units and formations of Russia
Russian fleets